James Whiting may refer to:

James Whiting (born 1949), known professionally as Sugar Blue, American blues harmonica player
James Whiting, fictional character in the American TV series The Wire
James H. Whiting (1848–1919), American industrialist and automobile pioneer; see Flint Wagon Works
James R. Whiting (1803–1872), American lawyer and politician

See also
James Whitin (1814–1902), American textile businessman
Whiting (disambiguation)